Sınırteke is a village in the District of İncirliova, Aydın Province, Turkey. In 2010 it had a population of 1159.

References

Villages in İncirliova District